Arch Alfred Moore Jr. (April 16, 1923 – January 7, 2015) was an American lawyer and Republican politician from West Virginia. He began his political career as a state legislator in 1952.  He was elected the 28th and 30th governor of West Virginia, serving from 1969 until 1977 and again from 1985 until 1989, he is the longest-serving West Virginia Governor in state history with 12 years of service. He is the father of U.S. Senator Shelley Moore Capito.

Amid allegations of corruption, Moore ran for reelection in 1988, but was defeated by Democrat Gaston Caperton.  He was eventually prosecuted for and pleaded guilty to five felony charges. In 1990, he was sentenced to five years and ten months in prison, serving over three years before his release. As a result of his conviction, Moore was disbarred and forfeited his state pension. In 1995, he paid a settlement of $750,000 to the state.

Early life
Moore was born in Moundsville, West Virginia, in the state's industrial northern panhandle, the son of Genevieve (née Jones) and Archie Alfred Moore. He was born into a political family. His grandfather, Forest Taylor Moore (1859-1950), was a ten-term delegate and minority leader in the West Virginia House of Delegates and his uncle, Everett Franklin Moore (1885-1965), was also a politician. Moore excelled at basketball while attending Moundsville High School. Upon graduation, he worked in a factory and on an oil pipeline.

He briefly attended Lafayette College in Easton, Pennsylvania, before he was drafted for World War II service. He was in the Army Specialized Training Program training to be an engineer, but military manpower requirements changed and he was sent to the infantry.  Assigned to the 334th Infantry Regiment, a unit of the 84th Infantry Division, he received a disfiguring wound in the jaw from enemy machine gun fire in Germany, November 1944.  Moore was left for dead for two days in a German farmer's beet field after 33 of the 36 members of his platoon died in battle. Following his wounding, he was transferred to Liege, Belgium, where he underwent facial reconstruction surgery. Because the bullet that had wounded him passed through his tongue, he was not able to speak for about a year after his wounding. Public speaking, a skill he would later exercise while holding public office, was part of his physical therapy. He would give "lectures" to troops on their way to the front lines. Sergeant Moore was decorated with the Purple Heart, Bronze Star, Combat Infantryman's Badge and European Theater of Operations Ribbon with three battle stars.

He then entered West Virginia University graduating in 1948 and then from its law school in 1951.  While at WVU, he was involved with student government and founded "Mountaineer Week," a celebration of West Virginia culture in response to his perception that the growing number of out-of-state students at the school were changing its character. The event has become a permanent part of the school's calendar. He was also a member of the Beta Psi chapter of Beta Theta Pi at West Virginia University and was a recipient of the fraternity's Oxford Cup.

After graduating from law school, Moore returned to Moundsville to practice law with his uncle, Everett Moore.

Congressional career, 1957–1969
Moore was elected to the West Virginia House of Delegates in 1952. In 1954, Moore made his first run for the US Congress, challenging incumbent Democratic Congressman Bob Mollohan, but lost. In 1956, Moore was elected to the seat following Mollohan having vacated it to run for Governor of West Virginia, a race Mollohan eventually lost to Republican Cecil Underwood. In 1962, his district was merged with the 3rd District of longtime Democratic incumbent Cleveland M. Bailey; Moore won by just 762 votes. Moore was subsequently re-elected in 1966, before seeking the governor's office in 1968. He served a total of six terms in Congress, from 1957 through 1969.

His terms in the House were marked by strong support for public works projects and for civil rights. Moore voted in favor of the Civil Rights Acts of 1957, 1960, 1964, and 1968, as well as the 24th Amendment to the U.S. Constitution and the Voting Rights Act of 1965. Moore became the ranking Republican on the House Subcommittee on Immigration and Nationality in 1960.

Governor of West Virginia, 1969–1977
Moore was elected to his first term as governor in 1968, defeating Cecil H. Underwood in the Republican primary and Democrat James Marshall Sprouse in the general election. Just two days before the general election, on November 3, 1968, Moore was in a helicopter crash in Lincoln County. He and West Virginia Supreme Court candidate Dennis Knapp were on their way to the town of Hamlin to campaign when their pilot crash landed the helicopter on the Hamlin High School football field in an attempt to avoid power lines. Moore sustained a ruptured leg muscle and two broken ribs in the crash, while Knapp suffered a broken collar bone. After winning the election, Moore told reporters he thought "the Lord voted for me" via the crash.

The state's Constitution, which had formerly had a one-term term limit and provided for a weak governor system, was amended in 1968 to strengthen the powers of the governor and in 1970 to provide for a two-term limit.  Moore became the first person re-elected governor in 1972, defeating Jay Rockefeller.

A notable event of Moore's first term was the 1969 strike of the state's highway workers. From March 3–11, over 2,600 of these workers struck in an attempt to get the state to recognize their union. Moore summarily fired those who had walked off the job, later citing this act as a matter of state safety. 530 of the highway workers who went on strike were able to reclaim their jobs after the strike was over, but more than 2,000 of them were permanently dismissed. Moore's stance during this strike was markedly different from actions on labor that he took later in his Governorship. He would go on to advocate for insurance benefits of hospital workers and pay increases for teachers and other school staff. Furthermore, he pressured the West Virginia legislature to increase workers compensation benefits by 75% and helped to settle a national strike of coal miners.

Moore's first two terms as governor are best remembered for improvements in the state's highway system and for the Buffalo Creek Flood disaster. This building was made possible by The Roads Development Amendment (1968), a $350 million bond amendment that gave the State of West Virginia the ability to match Federal highway funding to the state, as well as the Better Roads Amendment (1964), a $200 million bond issue. By the end of Moore's tenure as governor, all of I-79, I-64, I-68, and the West Virginia Turnpike (I-77) were completed.

Moore was actively involved in the National Governors Association during his tenure as Governor of West Virginia. He was chair of this organization from 1971 to 1972.

Corruption charges and trial
In 1975 Moore and his 1972 campaign manager were accused by federal prosecutors of extorting $25,000 from the president of a holding company seeking a state charter for a new bank. Both were acquitted in 1976.

Buffalo Creek settlement
In the last week of his second term in 1977, Moore accepted a $1 million payment from Pittston Coal Company to settle accounts from the Buffalo Creek Disaster. The state had initially sued for $100 million, half of which was slated to cover cleanup and restoration expenses. The reduced settlement accepted by Moore did not come close to covering the $9.5 million cleanup costs expended by the federal government; in 1988, these costs were reimbursed by the State of West Virginia. The government had been warned as early as the late 1960s of the instability of the Buffalo Creek gob dams, yet the state failed to take measures to prevent the accident from occurring.

Moore is also remembered for several other incidents stemming from the Buffalo Creek Disaster. After the flood, the governor attempted to use disaster relief funds to build a limited access superhighway through the hollow to connect Logan County with Raleigh County. Several hundred properties were purchased via eminent domain by the state for the right-of-way and a two lane road was reconstructed back up the hollow. The highway, however, failed to materialize. Subsequently, in many cases, the state refused to sell the former owners back their land.

Moore had also made a promise to residents of Buffalo Creek Hollow to construct a community center as part of the rebuilding effort. However, in the end, the center promised by Moore and the State of West Virginia was never built. Arnold & Porter, a Washington, D.C. law firm, handled a lawsuit filed by approximately 600 survivors, which resulted in a settlement of $13.5 million, or roughly $13,000.00 per person after legal fees. Arnold & Porter took a portion of the legal fees paid to them and had the community center constructed in the hollow at their expense.

In a 2007 interview with West Virginia Public Broadcasting, Moore claimed that he had nothing to do with the state's lawsuit against the Pittston Coal Company. Rather, it was the state's Attorney General, Chauncey H. Browning Jr. who handled the suit under the direction of laws passed by the state legislature. In Moore's words, he was blamed by unfair newspaper reports for the inequitable settlement because his signature appeared on its final documents. Moore claims that the lawyers from the Pittston Coal Company insisted that he sign these documents, though he had nothing to do with their contents.

U.S. Senate race, 1978
In 1976 Moore was legally barred from seeking a third term and declined to challenge incumbent Robert C. Byrd for a seat in the United States Senate. Instead, he began a two-year campaign for the state's other Senate seat, which was expected to be vacated by the aging Jennings Randolph in 1978. To the surprise of almost all observers, the obviously declining Randolph stood for re-election. His campaign was entirely financed by then-governor Jay Rockefeller, as Randolph's six-year term as Senator and a theoretical second Rockefeller term as governor would both expire in 1984, permitting Rockefeller to run for an open seat. Moore was outspent by 5 to 1 in this election, and lost by 4,717 votes.

Third term as Governor of West Virginia, 1985–1989
In 1980 Moore sought his third term as governor. Rockefeller outspent him by a figure of 20 to 1, and Moore again lost in a close contest.

In 1984 Moore once again ran for governor when Rockefeller made a successful bid for Senate. He defeated State House Speaker Clyde See to become the only West Virginia governor to be elected to three terms in office. He again turned his attention to highways, and saw the completion in 1988 of the last major section of interstate highway in the country, which had been left unbuilt during the Rockefeller terms. He was soundly defeated for reelection in 1988 by Gaston Caperton.

Federal conviction
In 1990, after an extensive federal investigation, Moore pleaded guilty to five felonies, including mail fraud, tax fraud, extortion, and obstruction of justice. He agreed to plead guilty after he was told that federal investigators had taped him conspiring with his former campaign manager, John Leaberry, to obstruct the investigation into his activities. Moore pleaded guilty to an indictment that said he accepted illegal payments from lobbyists during his 1984 and 1988 election campaigns, which he failed to report on his Federal income tax returns for 1984 and 1985. Furthermore, he also plead guilty to extorting more than $573,000 from Maben Energy Corporation, a coal company based in the town of Beckley, and obstructed the investigation of this activity. Moore had helped Maben receive a refund of $2 million from the state's Black Lung Fund, an aid program for miners with the disease, in exchange for roughly 25% of this sum.

For these crimes, Moore was fined $3.2 million, though he paid only $750,000, after reaching a settlement. He was sentenced to five years and ten months in prison. Of this sentence, Moore served two years and eight months in federal prison in Alabama and Kentucky and four months of home confinement at his home in Glen Dale, Marshall County.

After his guilty plea, Moore tried repeatedly to withdraw it. The United States Court of Appeals for the Fourth Circuit rebuffed his attempts to withdraw his plea in April 1991, and the U.S. Supreme Court refused his arguments in October 1995. For the remainder of his life, Moore continued to maintain his innocence. He later claimed that he made the plea based on bad advice. In an interview with West Virginia Public Broadcasting he said: "I followed advice that I got, that advice was not the right advice."

As a result of his conviction, Moore was disbarred. In the last decades of his life he tried vehemently to get his law license reinstated. When asked why he wanted to be reinstated, Moore cited his childhood desire to become a lawyer. "It's something I always was and something I always wanted to be," he said in a 2007 interview. He was unsuccessful.

Personal life
Moore married Shelley Riley in 1949. The two had met while students at WVU. They have three children. His daughter Shelley Moore Capito is the current junior United States senator from West Virginia. Moore's grandchildren, Moore Capito and Riley Moore, are also politicians.

Moore died in Charleston on January 7, 2015, at the age of 91, four days after his daughter, Shelley Moore Capito, was sworn into the United States Senate. When asked about his legacy, he said he was proud of his three terms as governor. "You'll run into Arch Moore stories for the rest of your life, and nine and half out of ten will be positive," he told West Virginia Public Broadcasting in 2007. "I'm still working on the other half."

In 2006 former West Virginia Tax Commissioner Brad Crouser, who served during Governor Moore's third term, published the first biography of Moore, Arch: The Life of Governor Arch A. Moore Jr.

Moore's political papers are housed at the West Virginia and Regional History Center at West Virginia University. This collection contains documents from his time as a Congressman and governor.

References

Further reading

External links

Biography of Arch A. Moore Jr.
Inaugural address of Arch A. Moore Jr. (1969)
Inaugural address of Arch A. Moore Jr. (1973)
Inaugural address of Arch A. Moore Jr. (1985)

|-

|-

|-

|-

|-

|-

|-

1923 births
2015 deaths
20th-century American politicians
Methodists from West Virginia
United States Army personnel of World War II
American politicians convicted of fraud
Disbarred American lawyers
Republican Party governors of West Virginia
Lafayette College alumni
Republican Party members of the West Virginia House of Delegates
Military personnel from West Virginia
Moore family of West Virginia
People convicted of obstruction of justice
People from Glen Dale, West Virginia
People from Moundsville, West Virginia
Politicians convicted of extortion under color of official right
Politicians convicted of mail and wire fraud
Republican Party members of the United States House of Representatives from West Virginia
United States Army soldiers
West Virginia politicians convicted of crimes
West Virginia University College of Law alumni